Carex solandri is a species of sedge that was first described by Francis Boott in 1853.

It is endemic to both the North and South Islands of New Zealand.

Taxonomy & naming
This plant was first described in 1853 by Francis Boott. Its specific epithet, solandri (originally Solandri), honours Daniel Solander who (with Joseph Banks) collected one of the specimens used by Boott in describing the species.

Conservation status
In 2017 de Lange and others declared it to be "not threatened" under the New Zealand Threat Classification System (NZTCS).

References

External links
Carex solandri occurrence data from the Australasian Virtual Herbarium
Carex solandri occurrence data from GBIF

solandri
Plants described in 1853
Taxa named by Francis Boott